The LG V40 ThinQ, commonly referred to as the LG V40, is an Android phablet manufactured by LG Electronics as part of the LG V series. It was announced on October 3, 2018 and is the successor to the previous devices in the LG V series, namely the LG V30, LG V30S ThinQ, and LG V35 ThinQ. The LG V40 released primarily in the United States on October 18, 2018.

Features
The V40 was LG's first smartphone to feature 5 cameras: 2 on the front and 3 on the back. On the front there are dual cameras, while on the back there is a telephoto lens, a standard lens, and a wide-angle lens. This feature was the marquee feature of the V40. The V40's camera received a score of 97 from DxOMark.

The V40 also featured a 3300 mAh battery, which was standard at the time for the V series (the V30 and its derivatives had also featured a 3300 mAh battery). The phone has built-in Qnovo's intelligent battery management software  which aims to extend the lifespan of the battery and provide best battery user experience.

References

LG Electronics smartphones
LG Electronics mobile phones
Mobile phones introduced in 2018
Android (operating system) devices
Mobile phones with multiple rear cameras
Mobile phones with 4K video recording
Discontinued smartphones